Autocrine motility factor receptor, isoform 2 is a protein that in humans is encoded by the AMFR gene.

Autocrine motility factor is a tumor motility-stimulating protein secreted by tumor cells. The protein encoded by this gene is a glycosylated transmembrane protein and a receptor for autocrine motility factor. The receptor, which shows some sequence similarity to tumor protein p53, is localized to the leading and trailing edges of carcinoma cells.

Model organisms

			Model organisms have been used in the study of AMFR function. A conditional knockout mouse line, called Amfrtm1a(KOMP)Wtsi was generated as part of the International Knockout Mouse Consortium program — a high-throughput mutagenesis project to generate and distribute animal models of disease to interested scientists.

Male and female animals underwent a standardized phenotypic screen to determine the effects of deletion. Twenty six tests were carried out on mutant mice and one significant abnormality was observed: Fewer than expected homozygous mutant mice survived until weaning.

Interactions
AMFR has been shown to interact with Valosin-containing protein.

References

External links

Further reading

Genes mutated in mice